Varkesh (also known as Bārkesh and Bārkīsh) is a village in Shur Dasht Rural District, Shara District, Hamadan County, Hamadan Province, Iran. At the 2006 census, its population was 62, in 16 families.

References 

Populated places in Hamadan County